Hurricane Boy Fuck You Tabarnak! is a Canadian short drama film, directed by Ara Ball and released in 2013. The film centres on Delphis (Luka Limoges), a young boy from a rough neighbourhood in Montreal who lives life according to his own rules, and calls himself "the Hurricane".

The film was a Prix Jutra nominee for Best Live Action Short Film at the 16th Jutra Awards in 2014.

In 2022, Bunbury Films announced that a full-length feature expansion of the film was in development.

References

External links

2013 films
2013 short films
Canadian drama short films
2010s English-language films
English-language Canadian films
French-language Canadian films
2010s Canadian films
Films shot in Montreal
Films set in Montreal